Isaac Campbell Kidd Jr. (August 14, 1919 – June 27, 1999) was an American admiral in the United States Navy who served as the Supreme Allied Commander of NATO's Atlantic Fleet, and also as commander in chief of the U.S. Atlantic Fleet from 1975 to 1978. He was the son of Rear Admiral Isaac C. Kidd, who was killed on the bridge of the battleship  during the Japanese attack on Pearl Harbor.

In 1978 Kidd was among a number of retired four-star officers who testified before Congress in favor of the controversial SALT II arms control pact.

Biography

Graduation
Born in Cleveland, Ohio, Kidd graduated from the U.S. Naval Academy in 1941; he was commissioned an ensign on December19, 1941, just 12 days after his father was killed aboard his flagship. As Time described the event, when Kidd received his commission as ensign "the U.S. Naval Academy and its guests broke into a thunderous cheer— an unprecedented demonstration in honor of Ensign Kidd and his father."  During World War II he served as a gunnery and operations officer on destroyers in both Europe and the Pacific, and participated in various Allied landings in the Mediterranean as well as at Iwo Jima.

Naval service
His 23 years at sea during his 37-year naval career included 15 years in command of destroyers, destroyer divisions and squadrons and three U.S. fleets in the Atlantic, Pacific and Mediterranean; he also served as executive assistant and senior aide to the Chief of Naval Operations in the early 1960s, earning citations for his efforts in the Cuban Missile Crisis and several other crises. In 1967, he headed the court of inquiry into the USS Liberty incident during the Six-Day War in June of that year.  From 1975 to 1978, Kidd served as Commander in Chief of the U.S. Atlantic Fleet.

Retirement
Shortly after his 1978 retirement, Kidd was among a number of retired four-star officers who testified before Congress in favor of the controversial SALT II arms control pact. Kidd declared that while he was not entirely thrilled with the proposed treaty's verification procedures, "the alternative of having no ceiling at all, considering our position at this point in the so-called race, I find totally unacceptable."

He also taught the law of the sea at the College of William and Mary. His six children included Navy Captain Isaac C. KiddIII.

Kidd died of cancer at age 79 at his home in Alexandria, Virginia, and was buried in the Naval Academy Cemetery.

Awards and decorations

References

1919 births
1999 deaths
United States Navy personnel of World War II
College of William & Mary faculty
United States Naval Academy alumni
United States Navy admirals
Recipients of the Defense Distinguished Service Medal
Recipients of the Legion of Merit
Burials at the United States Naval Academy Cemetery
Military personnel from Cleveland
Deaths from cancer in Virginia
Recipients of the Navy Distinguished Service Medal